The 2010–11 LPB season was the third season of the Liga Portuguesa de Basquetebol.

Promotion and relegation 

Teams promoted from 2009–2010 Proliga
 Lusitânia
 CB Penafiel

Teams relegated to 2010-2011 Proliga
 Física/Riberalves
 VagosNorbainLusavouga

Teams

Arenas and locations

Head coaches 

 1 Coach António Paulo Ferreira resigned on November 17, 2010.
 2 Coach Luis Brasil was sacked December 1, 2010.

Standings

Statistical leaders 
Season ending results

Points

Rebounds

Assists 
{| class="wikitable" style="text-align: center;"
|-
!Rank
!Name
!Team
!Assists
!Games
!width=40|APG
|-
|1.||align="left"| Nuno Manarte||Ovarense Dolce Vita || 173 || 25 || 6,9
|-
|1.||align="left"| Jorge Sing||Sampaense Basket || 139 || 22 || 6,3
|-
|1.||align="left"| Daniel Monteiro||S.C. Lusitânia EXPERT || 109 || 21 || 5,2'
|-
|4.||align="left"| João Reveles||Casino Ginásio || 113 || 23 || 4,9
|-
|5.||align="left"| Miguel Minhava||Sport Lisboa e Benfica || 167 || 35 || 4,8

References

External links 
 Federação Portuguesa de Basquetebol

Liga Portuguesa de Basquetebol seasons
Portuguese
LPB